Klaus Tange (born 7 July 1962) is a Danish actor working in theatre, film, and television.

Biography
Tange was born in  Copenhagen, Denmark and raised in Germany and Switzerland. In 1985 he graduated from the Danish National School of Theatre in Aarhus.

Since his graduation, Tange has worked extensively in all areas of theatre and film. He has been involved in genres ranging from experimental film and theatre, to high-profile movies and television series, as well as performances with established theatre companies. He has lived and worked in Italy, France, and Denmark.

Key performances
Some of Tange's best known roles include:
 Louis in Angels of America
 Ariel in The Pillowman, at the Aarhus Theatre
 Jesus in Jesus Christ Superstar, at the Det Ny Theater
 Chance Wayne in Sweet Bird of Youth, at the Betty Nansen Theatre, Denmark
 Hair, at Théâtre Mogador in Paris

Tange has also worked with Ellen Stewart from La MaMa Experimental Theatre Club, and Claudio Carafoli at the Piccolo Eliseo in Rome. Recent film and television work includes the Emmy-nominated series Forbrydelsen (The Crime), The Strange Color of Your Body's Tears, and the 2008 Danish movie Flammen & Citronen (Flame & Citron).

Filmography

References

External links

 Klaus Tange at Danskefilm.dk

1962 births
Living people
Danish expatriates in Germany
Danish expatriates in Switzerland
Danish male film actors
Danish male stage actors
Danish male television actors